The 2007–08 Tulsa Golden Hurricane men's basketball team represented the University of Tulsa in National Collegiate Athletic Association (NCAA) Division I men's basketball during the 2007–08 season. Playing in Conference USA (C-USA) and led by third-year head coach Doug Wojcik, the Golden Hurricane finished the season with a 25–14 overall record and won the 2008 College Basketball Invitational – the first year of the tournament's existence.

In C-USA play, the Golden Hurricane finished in sixth place with a 8–8 record. They advanced to the championship game of the 2008 C-USA tournament, where they lost to top-seeded Memphis, 77–51.

Roster

Schedule and results
Source:

|-
!colspan=9| Exhibition
 
|-
!colspan=9| Regular season

|-
!colspan=9| Conference regular season

|-
!colspan=9| 2008 Conference USA men's basketball tournament

|-
!colspan=9| 2008 College Basketball Invitational

Source:

References

Tulsa Golden Hurricane men's basketball seasons
Tulsa
College Basketball Invitational championship seasons
Tulsa
Tulsa Golden Hurricane Men's Basketball Team
Tulsa Golden Hurricane Men's Basketball Team